Paap-O-Meter (Meter-Of-Sins) is an Indian horror comedy cartoon show that airs on Indian television channel Sony Yay. The show is available in Hindi, English, Tamil, Telugu, Bengali, Marathi and Malayalam across major DTH and Digital Cable Platforms.

Plot 
The story revolves around the adventures of Bhoot Boss and his assistants Pakela and Thakela, who look for people who have sinned and teach them a lesson. Together, they live high in the sky, in the ghost world, and keep an eye on the planet earth to ensure that the sinners are always under control. The Meter Of Sins (Paap o meter) tells them if any human has committed a sin and by pressing its button, they can see what the person has done. Along with the main assistants, Bhootboss has many more assistants who feature occasionally in the show like Hatela.

When Pakela and Thakela are sent to make things right, they make every situation worse. That's when Bhoot Boss intervenes and corrects the situation.

Characters 

 Bhoot Boss: Bhoot Boss is a 35000-year-old man. The noble, disciplined leader of the trio, Bhoot Boss is in charge of the Paap-O-Meter, and is mainly responsible for keeping the level of sin on Earth in check. He is a mentor to Thakela and Pakela and always comes to their rescue, whenever they goof-up their mission to reduce the amount of sin on the planet. Bhoot Boss's most notable trait is his crippling drug addiction. In multiple episodes it shows to what extent his drug problem extends where he overdosed on heroine that was spliced with fentanyl. Thakela had to revive Bhoot Boss and save him.
 Thakela: Thakela is a 15-year-old boy. He is a lazy, junior ghost who works for Bhoot Boss and is a companion of Pakela. He is an adorable boy who loves to sleep and eat. If given a chance, he will sleep for days. His sleeping routines have made him so lazy that he throws tantrums every time he is called for duty. His love for eating is shown in various episodes.
 Pakela: Pakela is a 14-year-old boy. He is an equally lazy yet witty junior ghost, who also works for Bhootboss and is Thakela's partner. Like his associate, Pakela get irritated when he has to work. He always tries to beat Thakela, but fails miserably most of the time. Pakela is gunned down in season 4 episode 7 where they go to Brazil to stop a child trafficking ring. He plays more pranks than Thakela does.
  The Sinners: The Sinners are the bad people. They later become good people when they learn a lesson.
 Hatela: He is a more energetic ghost and always tricks Thakela and Pakela in whichever episode he appears in. He has a nice sense of humor which causes Bhoot Boss to appreciate him. They briefly enter into a relationship together in Season 2, until Hatela is shot by Bhoot Boss' wife.

Episodes 

 Season 1: 26 episodes (11 minutes each)
 Season 2: 26 episodes (11 minutes each)
 Season 3: 20 episodes (11 minutes each)
 Season 4: Airing on Sony Yay since 31 May 2021
Season 1

Season 2

All the episodes can be watched in Netflix and SonyLIV App.

Films

Paap-O-Meter Under Attack (2020)
Paap-O-Meter: Defenders of Earth (2020)

Paap-O-Meter: The Space Bandits (2021)

References

2017 Indian television series debuts
Indian children's animated comedy television series
Indian children's animated fantasy television series
Sony Yay original programming
Ghosts in television